2016 Jharkhand mob lynching refers to the case of lynching of two Muslim cattle traders by allegedly cattle-protecting vigilantes in Balumath forests of Latehar district in the Indian state of Jharkhand on 18 March 2016. The attackers killed 32 year old Mazlum Ansari and 12 year old Imtiaz Khan who were both found hanging from a tree.

Events

Attack
According to Jharkhand police, preliminary investigation revealed that the two were on their way to a cattle market in Chatra district. They had at least eight oxen with them, which they intended to sell. On 18 March 2016, they were reportedly caught by a group of tribal villagers in the early hours, beaten to death, and hanged from a tree. According to villagers, there were communal clashes over beef-eating in the area three months ago. Police stated that the murder was aimed at looting money and cattle.

Aftermath and arrests
Jharkhand Police arrested 5 people and identified them as Mithilesh Prasad Sahu also known by his nickname Bunty, Pramod Kumar Sahu, Manoj Kumar Sahu, Awadhesh Sahu and Manoj Sahu and are looking for three others, also said to be involved in the murders. One of the accused has links to a local Gau Raksha Samiti (an outfit for protection of cows).

Reactions
Opposition party Congress and Jharkhand Vikas Morcha condemned the attack and demanded justice for family of the two victims.

See also
 Cow vigilante violence in India since 2014

References

External links

Lynching deaths in India
Latehar district
March 2016 crimes in Asia
2016 mob lynching
March 2016 events in India
2016 murders in India
Anti-Muslim violence in India
Hinduism-motivated violence in India